Oxud (also, Oxut and Okhut) is a village and municipality in the Shaki Rayon of Azerbaijan.  It has a population of 4,825.

Notable natives 

 Ahmadiyya Jabrayilov — legendary fighter of French Resistance.
Mikayıl Jabrayılov — National Hero of Azerbaijan; son of Ahmadiyya Jabrayilov.

References 

Populated places in Shaki District